Mere Naam Hai Mohabaat is a 1975 Pakistani romantic drama film. It won the Nigar Award in 1975 for Best Film of the Year. The film was also released in China and became successful there.

Babra Sharif rose to become one of the most popular actresses of Pakistani cinema for almost two decades following the success of this film.

Plot summary
This film is a story of a sad romantic girl who has cancer. She tries to hide this from her lover. Her family is unaware of this problem also. The lovers are very idealistic and truly in love with each other and this film also has a tragic end just like Love Story (1970).

Cast
Babra Sharif
Ghulam Mohiuddin
Zarqa
Bahar Begum
Tamanna
 Rehan
Farzana
Allauddin
 Masood Akhtar

Production
The film's plot was reportedly inspired by a Chinese folk story.

Mera Naam Hai Mohabbat introduced  two new faces to the Pakistani silver screen, actor Ghulam Mohiuddin and actress Babra Sharif, propelling them into stardom due to the box-office success of this film.

Soundtrack
 Mehdi Hassan
Aage tum peechhe ham, jao ge kahan Ahmad Rushdi
Pyasa Kunwen kay paas aata hay Mehdi Hassan
Yeh Duniya rahe na rahe mere hamdam Naheed Akhtar and Mehdi Hassan
Phoolon ko dekh dekh kay sharma rahay hain aap Mehdi Hassan
Tujhe pyar karte karte meri umar beet jaye Mehdi Hassan
Tujhe pyar karte karte meri umar beet jaye Naheed Akhtar
Yeh Duniya rahay na rahay mere Hamdam (sad) Mehdi Hassan

Box office
Mera Naam Hai Mohabbat was a box office success in Pakistan.

Overseas in China, it released in 1981, following the success of Indian Bollywood films such as Awaara, Noorie and Caravan in the last several years. Mera Naam Hai Mohabbat became the highest-grossing foreign film of 1981, selling nearly  tickets in China.

References

External links 
 

1975 films
Pakistani romantic drama films
Films scored by M Ashraf
1975 romantic drama films
1970s Urdu-language films
Films about cancer
Nigar Award winners
Urdu-language Pakistani films